The 2011 New Brunswick Scotties Tournament of Hearts was held January 26–30 at the Curling Beauséjour Inc. in Moncton, New Brunswick. The winning team of Andrea Kelly represented New Brunswick at the 2011 Scotties Tournament of Hearts in Charlottetown, Prince Edward Island, where they finished round robin play with a record of 3-8.

Teams

Standings

Results

Draw 1
January 26  7:00 PM

Draw 2
January 27  9:00 AM

Draw 3
January 27  2:00 PM

Draw 4
January 27  7:00 PM ,

Draw 5
January 28  2:00 PM

Draw 6
January 28  7:00 PM

Draw 7
January 29  9:00 AM

Playoffs

Semifinal
January 29, 8:00 PM

Final
January 30, 2:30 PM

Qualification round

The qualification round for the 2011 New Brunswick Tournament of Hearts will take place December 17–19, 2010 at the Carleton Curling Club in Saint John, New Brunswick. The format of play shall be an open-entry double knockout qualifying eight teams to the Provincial playoffs at the Curling Beauséjour Inc. in Moncton, New Brunswick, January 26–30, 2011.

Teams

Qualifier A

Qualifier B

References

New Brunswick Scotties Tournament Of Hearts, 2011
New Brunswick
New Brunswick Scotties Tournament of Hearts
Curling competitions in Moncton
2011 in New Brunswick